is a Japanese actress. She has appeared in more than twelve films since 1998.

Selected filmography

References

External links 

1985 births
Living people
Japanese actresses
Japanese female models
Japanese gravure models
Actors from Chiba Prefecture